Søren Holdgaard (born 30 January 1979) is a former Danish professional football defender.

He has played a total 75 games in the Danish Superliga; with Aarhus Fremad from 1998 to 1999, and with Randers FC from 2004 to 2008.

External links
Danish Superliga statistics

1979 births
Living people
Danish men's footballers
AC Horsens players
Randers FC players
Skive IK players
Jammerbugt FC players

Association football defenders
FC Djursland players